Nuruzzaman Ahmed (born 3 January 1950) is a Bangladesh Awami League politician and the incumbent Jatiya Sangsad member from Lalmonirhat-2 constituency. He is the current minister of social welfare. He served as the state minister of social welfare and state minister of food.

Political life
He became the Minister of State in the Ministry of Food On 14 July 2015, one year after becoming a Member of Parliament. He held the post from June 21 of the same year to January 8, 2019. After winning the Eleventh Parliamentary Election, he has been serving as a Minister of the same Ministry since January 8, 2019.

Personal life
He is married to Hosne Ara Begum and the couple has 3 children.

References

Living people
1950 births
Awami League politicians
State Ministers of Social Welfare
State Ministers of Food (Bangladesh)
Social Welfare ministers of Bangladesh
10th Jatiya Sangsad members
11th Jatiya Sangsad members